6ixBuzzTV Ltd., doing business as 6ixBuzz (pronounced six-buzz), is a Canadian media platform and record company based in Toronto, Ontario. Founded in 2017 by Sarman Esagholian, and Abraham Tekabo the company provides entertainment stories, internet memes, and hip-hop music related content on its website and Instagram profile.

6ixBuzz is most known for sharing user-generated content, but has been criticized for misinformation, right-wing bias, racism, homophobia, anti-Feminism, and perpetuating racial stereotypes, particularly anti-Asian hate.

Background and activity 
6ixBuzz began as a meme and parody news profile on Instagram in 2017 with a focus on showcasing Toronto's underground music scene. Its founders, Sarman Esagholian and Abraham Tekabo, attribute the success of their online presence to the "lack of voice" of communities surrounding Canadian hip hop culture. As 6ixBuzz grew to over a million followers on Instagram, its account has become known for its ability to go viral, encouraging erratic stunts, bullying, and racial divide. Incumbent Ontario premier Doug Ford has been noted for his interactions with the company.

6ixBuzz was noted by The Varsity as introducing Toronto Caribbean slang to a global audience in an article published on March 8, 2020.

6ixBuzz was also involved with working with Ryerson University film student Angelica Milash, producing music videos on behalf of the company and their platform.

In January 2021, the company launched a re-faced website and a mobile app in an attempt to get more media coverage.

Accusations of misinformation and far-right ideology 
Throughout the COVID-19 pandemic in Canada, 6ixBuzz has consistently published posts that are anti-vax and anti-lockdown. They have been accused of spreading misinformation commonly associated with far-right politics. These accusations have been buoyed by frequent appearances of individuals associated with the far-right such as Chris Sky and Maxime Bernier.

Accusations of anti-Brampton hate 
6ixBuzz has also come under fire multiple times for its posts that appear to 'mock' those who live and reside in Brampton, Ontario. There have also been accusations of xenophobia, prejudice and racism as a result of Brampton's predominantly South Asian population. Brampton appears to a running joke amongst 6ixBuzz posts which include numerous posts saying "Brampton takes the L". The page has been heavily criticised amongst Brampton residents.

Accusations of anti-Asian hate 
During the beginning of the COVID-19 pandemic in Canada, 6ixBuzz was reported to have been causing harm to Chinese owned businesses in Ontario due to its coverage on the pandemic. A Markham, Ontario based noodle shop named "Wuhan Noodle 1950" claimed that they lost nearly two-thirds of their customer base in part due to an Instagram post by 6ixBuzz which was defamatory in nature. The post was eventually removed from the account on April 2, 2020.

The media group also posted videos and photos of the COVID-19 pandemic in China, allegedly perpetuating stereotypes and suggesting people of Chinese and Asian descent were to blame for the COVID-19 pandemic.

Notable people 
6ixBuzz has featured many real-life personas and characters.  Chromazz aka Janessa Melina Mendez, a Toronto-based rapper; and Marcella Christiana Zoia-Ferreira, dubbed Chair Girl who came to notoriety in Toronto for being videotaped throwing a chair onto the Gardiner Expressway in February 2019. Zoia later pleaded guilty in July 2020 to "Mischief Endangering Life" and received a $2,000 fine, 2 years probation and community service as well as counselling for her drinking problem. 

Toronto Debby, whose real name was Alexis Matos, was a popular 6ixBuzz character. Matos died November 2, 2021 following an overdose of Fentanyl.

6ixBuzz Entertainment

6ixBuzz Entertainment is a Canadian record label and a division of 6ixBuzz. Founded in 2018, the label currently releases compilation albums featuring Canadian hip hop artists, most of them based in Toronto. 6ixUpsideDown was released on October 19, 2018 and featured Pressa, Yung Tory, Big Lean, and Safe amongst other Toronto artists. It peaked at number 87 on the Billboard Canadian Hot 100 on November 3, 2018 and remained on the charts for 1 week. It contained production from artists exclusively from Toronto too, including the likes of Jmak, Jonah Zed, Pro Logic and more.

Its second compilation, NorthernSound, was released on December 13, 2019 and including vocal appearances from NorthSideBenji, Puffy L'z, Prime Boys, Pvrx, Archee & French, and more. The record featured the last work of Bvlly and Why-S before their deaths on December 24, 2019. Jmak was listed as the executive producer of the album, contributing to the production for the majority of the album.

In April 2020, the label announced a joint-venture record deal with Warner Music Canada, coinciding with the release of the single "VV's" featuring Killy and Houdini. This was followed by the single "Mansions" by Pressa and Houdini, which came after the death of Houdini after he was gunned down in May 2020. This was followed by the single "Name Brand" featuring LB Spiffy and Smiley in June. All three singles are said to be on the labels upcoming compilation album Canada's Most Wanted. Other artist including 88Glam, Top5 and French also made an appearance on the album. The album was officially released in June 11, 2021.

Releases

Awards and Nominations 

|-
| 2023
| "Alejandro Sosa" (with Pengz)
| Juno Award for Rap Single of the Year
| 
|}

See also

 Canadian hip hop
 HipHopCanada
 WorldStarHipHop

References

Sources

External links
 Official website

YouTube channels
Hip hop websites
Canadian music websites
Internet properties established in 2017
2017 establishments in Ontario
Record labels established in 2018
2018 establishments in Ontario
Canadian record labels
Companies based in Toronto
Instagram accounts